The First National Bank of Eddy is a historic building in Carlsbad, New Mexico. It was built by Caples and Hammer, a construction firm from El Paso, Texas, for the First National Bank of Eddy in 1890. Its chairman, Charles B. Eddy, was the town's namesake until it was changed to Carlsbad. The building was designed in the Late Victorian style by Ernest Krause, an architect from El Paso, Texas. It has been listed on the National Register of Historic Places since December 12, 1976.

References

	
National Register of Historic Places in Eddy County, New Mexico
Victorian architecture in New Mexico
Commercial buildings completed in 1890